Simmudo is a martial art created by Grandmaster Song Pan-Gong of Shi Heung City, South Korea.  Officially founded in 1999, Simmudo pronounced shim mu doh literally translates as "the way of the martial heart".

The techniques of Simmudo can be broken into three categories, Hoshin-suel, Chae-suel, and Kwon-suel.

The Hoshin-suel "self-defense techniques" of Simmudo are similar to Hapkido in that they use a wide variety of wrist-locks, arm-locks, "come-alongs," and various tripping and throwing maneuvers designed to bind the opponent and force them off balance, often into a throw.  The throwing techniques that complement these maneuvers comprise the second category of Simmudo, Chae-suel.

Chae-suel in Simmudo is designed to quickly drop and pin the attacker.  Also similar to the art of Hapkido the techniques most often keep the thrower in a ready position to quickly engage additional attackers.

Simmudo's Kwon-suel, "Striking technique," is a power-based striking system with many similarities to the arts of Tang Soo Do and Taekwondo.  This includes punching and kicking common to Taekwondo, as well as trapping and blocking strikes intended to disable and protect.

References

Korean Hoshinsuel Listing of arts

Korean martial arts